Titone is an Italian surname. Notable people with the surname include:

Brianna Titone, American politician
Mario Titone (born 1988), Italian footballer
Matthew Titone, American politician 
Jackie Sandler née Titone, American actress and model

See also
Tithonus, from Greek mythology, known in Italian as Titone

Italian-language surnames